This is a list of governors of the Venezuelan Nueva Esparta State:

Until 1989 they were appointed by the President of Venezuela. Starting from that year they are elected in universal, direct and secret elections.

Elected governors

(†) = Died in office.
(*) = Resigned office for health issues.

See also

 List of Governors of States of Venezuela
 Politics of Venezuela
 History of Venezuela

References 

 Cuadro Comparativo Gobernadores Electos por Entidad Elecciones 1989-1992-1995-1998-2000.
 CNE: Elecciones Regionales del 2004.
 CNE: Elecciones Regionales del 2008
 CNE: Elecciones Regionales del 2012
 CNE: Elecciones Regionales del 2017
 Venezuela vote dispute escalates foreign sanctions threat (2017)

Nueva Esparta
Nueva Esparta